Muhamed Glavović (born 1943) is a Bosnian retired football forward.

Club career
Born in Mostar, at middle of Second World War, he played with the local club FK Velež Mostar. where he played for almost entire 1960s decade. Later, he also played with Sloboda Užice and Radnički Niš.

References

1943 births
Living people
Sportspeople from Mostar
Association football forwards
Yugoslav footballers
Bosnia and Herzegovina footballers
FK Velež Mostar players
FK Sloboda Užice players
FK Radnički Niš players
Yugoslav First League players